Kim Carrigan (born in 1958) was Australia's leading exponent of rockclimbing during the late 1970s and early 1980s. Carrigan put up several hundred new routes on crags around the country, in particular at Mount Arapiles, Victoria, where he was based for several years. He repeatedly extended the limits of Australian climbing, initially by free climbing an old aid route Procul Harum to establish the first Australian climb graded 26 under the Ewbank grading system.  He went on to climb the first grade 27 (Denim), grade 28 (Yesterday), grade 29 (India) and grade 30 (Masada).  All of these climbs are located at Mount Arapiles.  Later he moved to Switzerland and became a triathlete. In the Swiss alps he did some difficult first ascents with the famous Swiss climber Martin Scheel, e.g. Truth of human desire at the Titlis.

Kim's current sport is Mountain Biking. He now lives in Brisbane where he has been successful in business; he part-owns and runs the Wild Breads / Sol Breads bakery supplying hundreds of retail outlets.

References 

Australian rock climbers
1958 births
Living people